Rois may refer to:

People
 Carrie Rois, victim of Gary Ridgway
 Joan Roís de Corella (1435–1497), Valencian author
 Juancho Rois (1958-1994), Colombian musician
 Sophie Rois, Austrian actress

Places
 Rois, Spain
 Rois-bheinn, Scotland
 Loch an Rois, Ireland

See also
Rois is also the plural form of roi, which is French for king. For that reason, the word rois appears in the title of many books and films: